Marie-Rose Gaillard (19 August 1944 – 18 June 2022) was a Belgian racing cyclist. She won the Belgian national road race title in 1966.

References

External links
 

1944 births
2022 deaths
Belgian female cyclists
Sportspeople from Liège
Cyclists from Liège Province
UCI Road World Champions (women)